Firewater is the second studio album by American country rock band Whiskey Myers. It was released on April 26, 2011, through Wiggy Thump Records in the United States.

Track listing

Personnel

Musicians 
 Cody Cannon - lead vocals, rhythm guitar, harp, percussion
 Cody Tate - guitar, vocals, percussion
 John Jeffers - guitar, vocals, percussion
 Gary Brown - bass, vocals, percussion
 Jeff Hogg - drums, percussion

Additional musicians 
 Leroy Powell - vocals, pedal steel, guitar, organ, magic spoons, percussion

Production 
 Leroy Powell - producer
 Eric Herbst - engineer
 Ray Kennedy - mastering
 Dean Tomasek - artwork design
 James Hertless - photography

Charts

References 

2012 albums
Whiskey Myers albums